The Wesleyan Church is a Methodist Christian denomination aligned with the holiness movement.

Wesleyan Church may also refer to:

 Wesleyan Methodist Church of Australia, the Australian branch of the Wesleyan Church

Denominations 
 Allegheny Wesleyan Methodist Connection, a Methodist denomination based in the United States 
 Evangelical Wesleyan Church, a Methodist denomination based in the United States
 Free Wesleyan Church of Tonga, the largest Methodist denomination in Tonga
 Wesleyan Methodist Church (Great Britain), the original British Methodist grouping, which merged into the Methodist Church of Great Britain in 1932
 Methodist Church of Great Britain; the successor to the Wesleyan Methodist Church in Great Britain after the Methodist Union of 1932
 Wesleyan Methodist Church (United States), a historic American denomination, which merged into the Wesleyan Church

Individual churches 
Wesleyan Methodist Church (Seneca Falls, New York)
Wesleyan Methodist Church (Weybridge, Vermont)
Skyline Church, a megachurch in La Mesa, California, associated with The Wesleyan Church

See also
List of Methodist churches
List of Methodist denominations
Wesleyan (disambiguation)
Methodism